Lai fun is a short and thick variety of Chinese noodles. It is commonly found in the Pearl River Delta region and to some degree among overseas Chinatowns. Its name comes from the Cantonese language.

Lai fun may also be referred to as bánh canh by Vietnamese, in which case, it is made from rice flour and tapioca starch.

Production
Lai fun noodles are made from rice flour and/or tapioca starch and are available in short or long varieties.

Comparison
Lai fun, a short and thick style of noodle, has a very similar appearance with silver needle noodles.  One way to distinguish the two is to look at the ends of each lai fun piece. The ends of lai fun noodles are often cut straight down as opposed to leaving a tapering "tail."

Gallery

See also
 Rice noodles

Chinese noodles
Hong Kong cuisine